The  British Virgin Islands passport is a British passport issued to British Overseas Territories citizens with a connection to the British Virgin Islands.

Passport statement
British Virgin Islands passports contain on their inside cover the following words in English only:

Physical appearance
The British Virgin Islands passport includes the following data:

 Photo of Passport Holder
 Type (P for passport)
 Code of Issuing State (GBR)
 Passport number
 Name
 Nationality (British Overseas Territories Citizen)
 Date of Birth 
 Sex
 Place of Birth
 Date of issue 
 Holder's signature 
 Date of expiry 
 Authority

See also 
 Visa requirements for British Overseas Territories Citizens
 British Virgin Islander passport information on PRADO

External links
VGB - Virgin Islands, British passport
Official website of the Civil Registry and Passport Office of the Deputy Governor's Office

British Virgin Islands
British passports issued to British Overseas Territories Citizens
Passport